The 2010–11 Butler Bulldogs men's basketball team represented Butler University in the 2010–11 NCAA Division I men's basketball season. Their head coach was Brad Stevens, serving his 4th year. The Bulldogs played their home games at the Hinkle Fieldhouse, which has a capacity of approximately 10,000. They are members of the Horizon League.

They were the first team to reach consecutive final four without being a one or a two seed either year. By reaching the 2011 NCAA Division I men's basketball tournament championship game, they were the third eight-seed team to do so and the first since the 1984–85 Villanova Wildcats. They were the first non-BCS school to reach the championship game in back-to-back seasons since the 1960–61 and 1961–62 Cincinnati Bearcats. They were also the first team to reach the championship game without being ranked in the final college basketball polls since the 1987–88 Kansas Jayhawks. They were the first national runner-up to return to the championship game since the 1990–91 Duke Blue Devils (not counting the Fab Five teams affected by the University of Michigan basketball scandal). In 2011, they lost the National Championship to The University of Connecticut Huskies.

2010 recruiting class

Roster

Schedule

|-
!colspan=12 style=| Exhibition

|-
!colspan=12 style=| Regular season

|-
!colspan=12 style=|Horizon League tournament

|-
!colspan=12 style=|NCAA tournament

Rankings

Preseason

Preseason rankings

Preseason awards

Preseason game capsules
10/30 – Butler vs Florida Southern

Butler Rolls Past Florida Southern, 90–70
Senior Matt Howard scored a game-high 19 points and teammate Ronald Nored added 14 to lead #17/18 Butler to a 90–70 victory over visiting Florida Southern in an exhibition men's basketball game at Hinkle Fieldhouse on Saturday, Oct. 30, afternoon. The game was Butler's first 2010–11 test.

11/4 – Butler vs Hanover

Butler Drops Hanover, 80–41, In Exhibition Game
Junior Shelvin Mack scored a game-high 13 points and senior Matt Howard added a double-double to lead Butler to an 80–41 victory over visiting Hanover in an exhibition contest at Hinkle Fieldhouse on Thursday, Nov. 4. The game was the final preseason test for the Bulldogs.

Regular season

Regular-season swards

Regular-season game capsules
11/13 – Butler vs Marian

Butler Rolls Past Marian, 83–54
Junior Shelvin Mack scored a game-high 20 points to lead Butler to an 83–54 victory over visiting Marian in the season-opener for the Bulldogs at Hinkle Fieldhouse on Saturday, Nov. 13. All 14 Butler players saw action in the win and 12 cracked the scoring column.

11/16 – Butler at Louisville

Bulldogs Fall At Louisville, 88–73
Rakeem Buckles scored 17 points and four teammates added double-figures to lead host Louisville to an 88–73 victory over #16/18 Butler in the opening game of the new KFC Yum! Center on Tuesday, Nov. 16. The loss dropped Butler to 1–1 on the young season.

11/13 – Butler vs Ball State

Butler Rolls To Big Win Over Ball State
Shelvin Mack scored a game-high 19 points and teammate Matt Howard added a double-double to lead #16/18 Butler to an 88–55 victory over visiting Ball State in a non-league game at Hinkle Fieldhouse on Saturday, Nov. 20. The win lifted to Bulldogs to 2–1 on the young season.

11/16 – Butler at Siena

Bench Lifts Butler To 70–57 Win At Siena
Senior Matt Howard posted his second consecutive double-double and Butler picked up a big lift from the bench in a 70–57 victory over Siena in a non-league game at Times Union Center on Tuesday, Nov. 23. It was Butler's second straight win and lifted the Bulldogs to 3–1 on the young season.

11/27 – Butler vs Evansville

Bulldogs Lose In Overtime To Evansville, 71–68
Forward Denver Holmes hit a clutch three-point field goal with 0:18 left in overtime to lift visiting Evansville to a 71–68 victory over Butler in a non-league game at Hinkle Fieldhouse on Saturday, Nov. 27. The loss, Butler's first at home in the past 18 games, left the Bulldogs at 3–2 on the young season.

12/1 – Butler at Loyola

Bulldogs Hold Off Loyola, 65–63
Senior Zach Hahn hit a pair of clutch free throws with seven seconds remaining and Butler handed host Loyola its first 2010–11 loss, 65–63, in the Horizon League opener for both teams at the Joseph J. Gentile Center on Wednesday, Dec. 1.

12/4 – Butler vs. Duke

Butler Fall To Top-Ranked Duke, 82–70
Senior Kyle Singler sparked an 11–0 run midway through the second half that lifted No. 1 Duke to an 82–70 victory over Butler in the Carquest Auto Parts Classic at the IZOD Center in East Rutherford, N.J. The nationally televised game was a rematch of last spring's NCAA Division I Championship game.

12/9 – Butler at Xavier

Xavier Edges Butler, 51–49
Guard Mark Lyons made two free throws with 0:03.4 left on the clock to lift host Xavier to a 51–49 victory over Butler in a non-league game at the Cintas Center on Thursday (Dec. 9). The loss was Butler's second straight and third in the last four games.

12/11 – Butler vs. Mississippi Valley State

Bulldogs Roll Past Mississippi Valley State
Senior Matt Howard scored a season-high 26 points and sparked Butler to a 91–71 victory over visiting Mississippi Valley State in a non-league game at Hinkle Fieldhouse on Saturday, Dec. 11. The win snapped the Bulldogs’ two-game skid.

12/18 – Butler vs Stanford

Bulldogs Cruise Past Stanford, 83–50
Senior Matt Howard posted his fourth double-double of the season and Butler cruised to an 83–50 victory over visiting Stanford in a non-league game at Hinkle Fieldhouse on Saturday, Dec. 18. The victory, which was nationally televised on CBS, lifted the Bulldogs to 6–4 on the young season.

12/22 – Butler vs Utah
Diamond Head Classic Opening Round

Bulldogs Hold On Against Utah, 74–62
Senior Matt Howard scored a game-high 23 points and junior Ronald Nored added a career-high 16 points, all in the second half, to lead Butler to a 74–62 victory over Utah in the first round of the Diamond Head Classic at the Stan Sheriff Center on Wednesday, Dec. 22. It was the third straight win for the 7–4 Bulldogs.

12/23 – Butler vs Florida State
Diamond Head Classic Semifinals

Bulldogs Edge Florida State, 67–64
Junior Shelvin Mack scored all of his 17 points in the second half to help Butler hold on to a 67–64 victory over Florida State in the semifinals of the 2010 Diamond Head Classic at the Stan Sheriff Center on Thursday, Dec. 23. The win sends the Bulldogs into the title game against Washington State on Christmas Day.

12/25 – Butler vs Washington State
Diamond Head Classic Championship

Bulldogs Win Diamond Head Classic
The Butler men's basketball team is coming home from sunny Hawaii with a tournament championship. The Bulldogs buried a barrage of 3-pointers en route to an 84–68 win over Washington State in the title game of the Diamond Head Classic.

1/1 – Butler vs Valparaiso

Butler Pulls Away From Valparaiso, 76–59
Junior Shelvin Mack led a balanced attack with 16 points and Butler used a strong closing run to defeat visiting Valparaiso, 76–59, in a feature Horizon League game at Hinkle Fieldhouse on New Year's Day. The win was Butler's sixth straight and lifted the Bulldogs to 10–4 on the season and 2–0 in league play.

1/3 – Butler at Milwaukee

Milwaukee Overpowers Butler, 76–52
Forwards Anthony Hill and Tony Meier combined for 42 points and guard Kaylon Williams added a triple-double to help host Milwaukee cruise to a 76–52 victory over Butler at U. S. Cellular Arena on Monday, Jan. 3. It was Butler's biggest margin of defeat in more than five seasons.

1/7 – Butler vs Cleveland State

Butler Rolls Over Cleveland State, 79–56
Sophomore Andrew Smith made the most of his first career appearance against Cleveland State, finishing with his first career double-double and leading Butler to a convincing, 79–56, victory over the league-leading Vikings at Hinkle Fieldhouse on Friday, Jan. 7. The win helped lift the Bulldogs into a four-way tie for second place in the Horizon League.

1/9 – Butler vs Youngstown

Butler Survives Hot-Shooting Youngstown State, 84–79
Junior Shelvin Mack scored a career-high 28 points and senior Matt Howard added 26 to help Butler hold off a hot-shooting Youngstown State team, 84–79, at Hinkle Fieldhouse on Sunday, Jan. 9. The victory lifted Butler into a share of first place in the Horizon League.

1/14 – Butler at Detroit

Butler Rolls Over Detroit, 87–64
Senior Matt Howard led five Butler players in double-figures with 17 points and the Bulldogs pulled away to an 87–64 victory over Detroit in a first place showdown at Calihan Hall on Friday, Jan. 14. The 23-point win left the Bulldogs tied with Valparaiso for the top spot in the league.

1/16 – Butler at Wright State

Wright State Takes 69–64 Decision From Bulldogs
A three-point field goal attempt to tie the game by Butler's Shelvin Mack with 0:06 remaining hit the back of the rim and the front of the rim twice, before popping out, and host Wright State held on to hand the Bulldogs a 69–64 setback at the Nutter Center on Sunday (Jan. 16) evening.

1/21 – Butler vs Green Bay

Bulldogs Hold Off Green Bay, 81–75
Senior Matt Howard turned in the best overall performance of his Butler career and the Bulldogs held off a late charge by visiting Green Bay to post an 81–75 Horizon League win at Hinkle Fieldhouse on Friday (Jan. 21). The win helped the Bulldogs maintain a share of second place in the league standings.

1/23 – Butler vs Milwaukee

Bulldogs Fall In Overtime To Milwaukee, 86–80
Visiting Milwaukee turned a 13–4 scoring run in overtime into an 86–80 victory over Butler in a rematch at Hinkle Fieldhouse on Sunday (Jan. 23) afternoon. The loss kept Butler from gaining a share of first place in the Horizon League.

1/29 – Butler at Valparaiso

Butler Falls In Overtime At Valparaiso, 85–79
Host Valparaiso hit five of seven shots, including two from beyond the three-point arc, and pulled away to an 85–79 victory over Butler in a key Horizon League showdown at the Athletics-Recreation Center on Saturday, Jan. 29. The win lifted the Crusaders into a share of first place in the league, while Butler slipped to fourth.

2/3 – Butler at Youngstown

Youngstown State Upsets Butler, 62–60
Freshman Kendrick Perry capped a 10–0 closing run with a three-point field goal to lift host Youngstown State to a 62–60 victory over Butler at the Beeghly Center on Thursday, Feb. 3. The loss was Butler's third straight and dropped the Bulldogs to 14–9 on the season and 6–5 in the Horizon League.

2/5 – Butler at Cleveland

Bulldogs Upend Cleveland State, 73–61
Senior Matt Howard led five players in double figures and Butler pulled away in the second half to defeat league-leading Cleveland State, 73–61, at the Wolstein Center on Saturday, Feb. 5. The win snapped Butler's three-game losing skid and gave the Bulldogs a season sweep of the first place Vikings.

2/7 – Butler vs UIC

Bulldogs Hold Off UIC, 72–65
Butler overcame the loss of its leading scorer and rebounder and an early second half deficit to hand visiting UIC a 72–65 setback in a hard-fought Horizon League game at Hinkle Fieldhouse on Monday, Feb. 7. The win lifted the Bulldogs into a tie for fourth place in the league standings.

2/10 – Butler vs Wright State

Bulldogs Knock Off Wright State, 71–63
Playing without leading scorer and rebounder Matt Howard, Butler pulled together one of its best shooting performances of the season and handed visiting Wright State at 71–63 setback in a key Horizon League game at Hinkle Fieldhouse on Thursday (Feb. 10). The win was Butler's third straight and lifted the Bulldogs to 17–9 on the season and 9–5 in league play.

2/12 – Butler vs Detroit

Second Half Lifts Butler Past Detroit, 66–51
Junior Shelvin Mack single-handedly out-scored visiting Detroit in the final 20 minutes and Butler pulled away to a 66–51 Horizon League victory at Hinkle Fieldhouse on Saturday (Feb. 12). The win was Butler's fourth straight and lifted the Bulldogs into a tie for third place in the league standings.

2/15 – Butler at Green Bay

Butler Edges Green Bay, 64–62
Senior Matt Howard's slam dunk with 0:01.8 left on the clock lifted visiting Butler to a 64–62 victory over Green Bay in a Horizon League game at the Resch Center on Tuesday (Feb. 15). The win was Butler's fifth straight and boosted the Bulldogs into third place in the league standings.

2/19 – Butler at UIC

Butler Rolls At UIC, 79–52
Senior Matt Howard led four Butler players in double-figures and the Bulldogs used a strong finish to the first half to pull away from host UIC and post a 79–52 victory at the UIC Pavilion on Saturday, Feb. 19. The win was Butler's sixth straight and gave the Bulldogs a sixth consecutive 20-win season.

2/26 – Butler vs Loyola

Butler Clinches Record Fifth Straight League Title
Junior Shelvin Mack scored a game-high 18 points and Butler rallied in the absence of head coach Brad Stevens to defeat Loyola, 63–56, in a key Horizon League game at Hinkle Fieldhouse on Saturday. The win, Butler's seventh straight, gave the Bulldogs a share of a league-record fifth straight Horizon League title.

Postseason

Postseason awards

Postseason game capsules
3/5 – Butler vs Cleveland State
Horizon League Tournament Semifinal

Vanzant Leads Butler To Horizon League Title Game
Senior Shawn Vanzant scored all his team-high 18 points in the final 13 minutes of the game to help lead Butler past Cleveland State, 76–68, in the semifinals of the 2011 Horizon League Men's Basketball Championship at U. S. Cellular Arena in Milwaukee, Wis., on Saturday (March 5). The win sends Butler to a league-record sixth straight tournament championship game.

3/8 – Butler vs Milwaukee
Horizon League tournament championship

Defense Lifts Butler To League Crown
Senior Matt Howard scored a game-high 18 points and Butler used a rock-solid defensive effort to defeat top-seeded Milwaukee, 59–44, in the title game of the 2011 Horizon League Men's Basketball Championship at U. S. Cellular Arena on Tuesday, March 8.

3/17 – Butler vs Old Dominion
NCAA second round (round of 64)

Howard Lifts Butler Over Old Dominion
Forward Matt Howard hit a lay-up with less than a second remaining to lift Butler to a 60–58 victory over Old Dominion in the second round of the 2011 NCAA Men's Basketball Championship at the Verizon Center on Thursday (March 17). The win advances the Bulldogs to the third round of the tournament on Saturday (March 19).

3/19 – Butler vs #4 Pittsburgh
NCAA Third round (round of 32)

Bulldogs Heading To Sweet 16
For the fourth time in nine years, the Butler men's basketball team is going to the Sweet 16. The Bulldogs picked up their 11th straight win Saturday night, winning in the final second for the second time in three days.

3/24 – Butler vs #16 Wisconsin
NCAA Sweet Sixteen

Bulldogs Win, Move To Elite Eight
For the second time in school history, Butler men's basketball has advanced to the Elite 8. Senior Matt Howard scored 20 points and junior Shelvin Mack added 13 in a 61–54 win over Wisconsin in the NCAA Southeast Regional semifinal Thursday night in New Orleans Arena. BU will play Florida Saturday with a Final Four berth on the line.

3/26 – Butler vs #13 Florida
NCAA Elite Eight

NEXT STOP: HOUSTON FOR THE FINAL FOUR
For the second consecutive year, the Butler men's basketball team has captured the eyes of the nation. For the next week, the Butler Bulldogs will be the top story in all of sports as they head to the NCAA Final Four in Houston.

4/2 – Butler vs Virginia Commonwealth
NCAA Final Four

DAWGS BEAT VCU, ADVANCE TO NATIONAL TITLE GAME
The Bulldogs’ remarkable tourney run to Houston will last one more game. Butler is back in the NCAA national final, grinding its way to a 70–62 win over VCU Saturday night in the Final Four.

4/4 – Butler vs #9 Connecticut
NCAA Championship Game

Bulldogs Finish As National Runner-up
For the second consecutive year, the Butler men's basketball team is the national runner-up. Connecticut held the Bulldogs to 18.8 percent shooting and the Huskies defeated BU in the NCAA national title game, 53–41. Butler finishes the year 28–10.

See also
2011 NCAA Division I men's basketball tournament

References

Butler Bulldogs Men's
Butler Bulldogs men's basketball seasons
Butler
NCAA Division I men's basketball tournament Final Four seasons
Butler Bulldogs men's basketball
Butler Bulldogs men's basketball